Sergei Vasilyevich Nikitin (born 2 August 1963) is a Russian professional football coach and a former player and referee.

Club career
He made his professional debut in the Soviet Top League in 1982 for FC Spartak Moscow.

Referee career
After his retirement as a player, he became a referee, mostly in the third-tier Russian Professional Football League.

Honours
 Soviet Top League runner-up: 1983.
 Soviet Top League bronze: 1982.

References

1963 births
Footballers from Moscow
Living people
Soviet footballers
Russian footballers
Association football midfielders
Association football defenders
Soviet Top League players
Russian Premier League players
FC Spartak Moscow players
FC Spartak Vladikavkaz players
FC Shinnik Yaroslavl players
FC Asmaral Moscow players
Russian football referees
Russian football managers
FC FShM Torpedo Moscow players
FC Iskra Smolensk players